This is a list of the cities of the People's Republic of China, including all direct-controlled municipalities, sub-provincial cities, prefecture-level cities, but excluding special administrative regions, in order of their life expectancy. Some data count the city's hukou holders only.

Most cities with high life expectancy are located in the Yangtze River Delta, Pearl River Delta and Beijing-Tianjin region.

See also 
List of Chinese administrative divisions by life expectancy
 List of Asian countries by life expectancy

References 

Life expectancy
Life expectancy
Life expectancy
China
China health-related lists